Gustaf Johansson may refer to:

 Gustaf Johansson (bishop) (1844–1930), Archbishop of Turku, Finland
 Gustaf Johansson (ice hockey) (1900–1971), Swedish ice hockey player
 Gustaf Torsten Johansson, Swedish philatelist 
 Gustaf Johansson (swimmer), Swedish Short Course Swimming Championships men's 200m butterfly champion 1992–1993